Lilley Township is a civil township of Newaygo County in the U.S. state of Michigan. The population was 788 at the 2000 census.

The unincorporated communities of Bitely and Lilley are within the township.

Geography

Demographics
As of the census of 2000, there were 788 people, 342 households, and 228 families residing in the township. The population density was 22.9 per square mile (8.8/km2). The racial makeup of the township was 94.67% White, 1.78% African American, 1.40% Native American, 0.13% Asian, 0.13% from other races, and 1.90% from two or more races. Hispanic or Latino of any race were 1.02% of the population.

There were 342 households, out of which 24.3% had children under the age of 18 living with them, 55.8% were married couples living together, 6.1% had a female householder with no husband present, and 33.3% were non-families. 27.8% of all households were made up of individuals, and 12.9% had someone living alone who was 65 years of age or older.  The average household size was 2.30 and the average family size was 2.76.

In the township the population was spread out, with 22.2% under the age of 18, 5.3% from 18 to 24, 23.4% from 25 to 44, 29.9% from 45 to 64, and 19.2% who were 65 years of age or older.  The median age was 44 years. For every 100 females, there were 103.6 males.  For every 100 females age 18 and over, there were 111.4 males.

The median income for a household in the township was $25,870, and the median income for a family was $26,700. Males had a median income of $29,125 versus $16,458 for females. The per capita income for the township was $12,765.  About 16.8% of families and 20.2% of the population were below the poverty line, including 30.0% of those under age 18 and 2.9% of those age 65 or over.

References

Townships in Newaygo County, Michigan
Grand Rapids metropolitan area
Townships in Michigan